Umyotsky District  is an administrative and municipal district (raion), one of the twenty-three in Tambov Oblast, Russia. It is located in the east of the oblast. The district borders with Gavrilovsky District in the north, Tamalinsky District of Penza Oblast in the east, Inzhavinsky District in the south, and with Kirsanovsky District in the west. Its administrative center is the urban locality (a work settlement) of Umyot. Population: 12,044 (2010 Census);  The population of Umyot accounts for 39.4% of the district's total population.

Notable residents 

Metropolitan Benjamin (1880–1961), Orthodox missionary and bishop, born in the village of Vazhki (Ilyinka)
Mikhail Khozin (1896–1979), Soviet general, born in the village of Skachikha

References

Notes

Sources

Districts of Tambov Oblast